Howard St. John (October 9, 1905 – March 13, 1974) was a Chicago-born character actor who specialized in unsympathetic roles. His work spanned Broadway, film and television. Among his best-remembered roles are the bombastic General Bullmoose in the stage and screen versions of the 1956 musical Li'l Abner, and his supporting roles in the classic comedies Born Yesterday (1950) and One, Two, Three (1961).

Early years
St. John was born in Chicago and grew up in several Canadian cities. When he was a boy, his main interest lay in sports. His participation in football and hockey led to his breaking his nose three times.

St. John toured Canada as a boy singer, and he was a newspaperman and a stockbroker.

Stage
St. John made his Broadway debut portraying James Manton in The Blonde Sinner (1926), and subsequently appeared in more than 20 Broadway productions including Someone Waiting and The Highest Tree.

St. John's most high-profile role was that of General Bullmoose in the hit musical Li'l Abner. As Bullmoose he introduced the song "Progress is the Root of All Evil." His final Broadway role came in 1968's Tiger at the Gates.

Film

St. John began film work in the early 1930s and made an impression in Alfred Hitchcock's Strangers on a Train in 1951. He continued in stuffy, rigid or authoritarian roles for most of his career, including memorable ones in The Tender Trap and Born Yesterday. He also re-created his stage role in the film version of Li'l Abner.

St. John had the title role in the film David Harding, Counterspy and continued in the role in the sequel Counterspy Meets Scotland Yard (1950).

Television 
St. John portrayed Lloyd Prior on the NBC crime drama The Investigator (1958).

Death

St. John died of a heart attack in New York City at age 68 in 1974.

Partial filmography

Shockproof (1949) - Sam Brooks
The Undercover Man (1949) - Joseph S. Horan
Customs Agent (1950) - Charles Johnson
711 Ocean Drive (1950) - Lt. Pete Wright
David Harding, Counterspy (1950) - David Harding
The Men (1950) - Ellen's Father
Mister 880 (1950) - Chief
The Sun Sets at Dawn (1950) - The Warden
Counterspy Meets Scotland Yard (1950) - Counterspy David Harding
Born Yesterday (1950) - Jim Devery
Goodbye, My Fancy (1951) - Claude Griswold
Strangers on a Train (1951) - Police Capt. Turley
Saturday's Hero (1951) - Belfrage
Close to My Heart (1951) - I.O. Frost
The Big Night (1951) - Al Judge
Starlift (1951) - Steve Rogers
Stop, You're Killing Me (1952) - Commissioner Mahoney
Three Coins in the Fountain (1954) - Burgoyne
Illegal (1955) - E.A. Smith
The Tender Trap (1955) - Mr. Sayers
I Died a Thousand Times (1955) - Doc Banton
World in My Corner (1956) - Harry Cram
Li'l Abner (1959) - General Bullmoose
Cry for Happy (1961) - Vice Adm. Junius B. Bennett
Sanctuary (1961) - Governor Drake
Madison Avenue (1961) - J.D. Jocelyn
One, Two, Three (1961) - Wendell P. Hazeltine
Lover Come Back (1961) - Mr. John Brackett
La Fayette (1961) - George Washington
Madison Avenue (1962) - J.D. Jocelyn
Strait-Jacket (1964) - Raymond Fields
Fate Is the Hunter (1964) - Mark Hutchins
Quick, Before It Melts (1964) - Harvey T. Sweigert
Sex and the Single Girl (1964) - Randall
Strange Bedfellows (1965) - Julius L. Stevens
Banning (1967) - J. Pallister Young
Matchless (1967) - General Shapiro
Don't Drink the Water (1969) - Ambassador Magee

References

External links

 
 

Male actors from Chicago
1905 births
1974 deaths
20th-century American male actors
American male film actors
American male television actors
American male musical theatre actors
20th-century American singers
20th-century American male singers